Ronald Sapa Tlau is a Congress politician from Mizoram who represented Mizoram in the Rajya Sabha.

Education
Ronald Sapa Tlau has completed his undergraduate studies from Spicer Adventist University and post graduate studies from Howard University in Communication for rural development.

Career
He was the General Secretary of Mizoram Pradesh Congress Committee as well as the spokesperson of the party in Mizoram. He was the chairman of the public sector Zoram Electronics Development Corporation Limited (ZENICS) since 2009 and has also unsuccessfully contested the Assembly polls from Hrangturzo seat in Mizoram Assembly elections in 2008. He was nominated to become member of Rajya Sabha by winning 34 of the 40 seats of the Mizoram Legislative Assembly in 2014. He was  a Member of Committee on Health and Family Welfare of India. He played an important role in establishment of Zoram Medical College and Thenzawl golf course during his term as Rajya Sabha MP.

Personal life
He is married to Ramthanpari Tlau and has two sons and one daughter.

Books
He has written the following books:
 Raltiang Ram
 Sakhaw Zalenna
 Zoramthar
 Hindu Kulmut

Religious Beliefs
He is a practicing Seventh-day Adventist Christian.

See also
List of Rajya Sabha members from Mizoram

References

Indian National Congress politicians
Rajya Sabha members from Mizoram
Living people
People from Serchhip district
1954 births
Indian Seventh-day Adventists
Mizo people
Mizoram politicians